In enzymology, an arylalkyl acylamidase is an enzyme that catalyzes the chemical reaction

N-acetylarylalkylamine + H2O  arylalkylamine + acetate

Thus, the two substrates of this enzyme are N-acetylarylalkylamine and H2O, whereas its two products are arylalkylamine and acetate.

This enzyme belongs to the family of hydrolases, those acting on carbon-nitrogen bonds other than peptide bonds, specifically in linear amides.  The systematic name of this enzyme class is N-acetylarylalkylamine amidohydrolase. This enzyme is also called aralkyl acylamidase.

References

 

EC 3.5.1
Enzymes of unknown structure